The 1997–98 season are the Esteghlal Football Club's 6th season in the Azadegan League, and their 4th consecutive season in the top division of Iranian football. They are also competing in the Caspian Cup and Turkmenistan President's Cup, and 53rd year in existence as a football club.

Player
As of 1 September 2018.

Pre-season and friendlies

Competitions

Overview

Azadegan League

Standings

Results summary

Results by round

Matches

Caspian Cup

Turkmenistan President's Cup

See also
 1997–98 Azadegan League

References

External links
 RSSSF

1997–98
Esteghlal